Radovan Hromádko (born 16 May 1969 in Náchod) is a Czech former football player. He played club football for seven years at Jablonec, where he made 109 league appearances, scoring 26 times. He also played international football for the Czech Republic. He made two appearances for the national team, making his debut against Kuwait on 13 December 1995.

References

External links

1969 births
Living people
People from Náchod
Czechoslovak footballers
Czech footballers
Czech Republic international footballers
Czech First League players
FK Jablonec players
FK Viktoria Žižkov players
Maccabi Haifa F.C. players
Expatriate footballers in Israel
Czech expatriate footballers
Association football forwards
Sportspeople from the Hradec Králové Region